Mahananda Poudyal was an Indian writer, a former teacher, social worker and political thinker.

Personal life
Mahananda Poudyal was born in Kalimpong, Darjeeling district, India on 19 January 1931. His father's name was Khadananda Poudyal. He obtained his primary education from St. Michael Roman Catholic School, Kalimpong. Later, he went on to study at the Scottish Universities Mission Institution (SUMI). He was a very bright student from a young age. So immediately after finishing high school he was hired to work as a teacher in Tashi Namgyal Senior Secondary School (TNSSS) in Gangtok, Sikkim. After working for about 3 years he decided to go to college and completed his bachelor's degree which he received in 1956 from Darjeeling Government College. He then went on to complete his Masters of Arts (MA) degree from Tribhuvan University, Kathmandu Nepal. Once completing his education, he came back to work as a teacher in the Government of Sikkim for about 11 years quickly rising to the position of Deputy Director for the Department of Education of Sikkim in 1977. In 1988, he retired from his position in the Department of Education to pursue a full-time career in Nepali literature......

Literary work
Known to be inspired by his own family and people surrounding him in his daily life, Mahananda Poudyal found a mentor in his own father Khadananda Poudyal, who was a well-known Sanskrit scholar. The first poem Mahananda Poudyal wrote was titled Mitra Barga (which means My Friends). It was published in the school magazine of the Scottish Universities Mission Institution in 1952. He also wrote short stories, essays, travelogues and criticisms. His publications include Jhumra Ko Putali (1988), Hamra Kehi Lok Katha (1988), Shakespheare Ka Kehi Natya Katha (1996), Bichar Afnai Chhitiz Tira (1996), Chanda Ra Alankar (1988), Sanobhai, Shree Katha, Fulharu, Patiharu (2002) and Bhasha Sahitya Barha Bakhan. A complete list of his publications are as follows

Short stories
 Jhumra Ko Putali (collection of short stories)

Poems
 Mitra Barga, first poem published.

Folktales collection
 Hamra Kehi Lokkatha (Folk tales)

Edited works
 Dhrubatara
 Sahitya Sankshep
 Parijaat
 Padya Saurav
 Gadya Saurav
 Sikkim ka Pratham Kawi Santabir Limboo-Krititwa Katipaya
 Kawi Narendra Kumai Krititwa Ewam Mulyankan

Translations
 Shakespeare Ka Kehin Natya Katha, (Nepali translation of Shakespeare’s dramatic stories)
 Sanobhai (Translation from Hindi)

Mahananda Poudyal has been an active contributor in many literary magazines and journals. In addition he has been the editor of various publications in the region. His association with some of the journals and publications include
 1954- Nav Prabhat, Bi monthly with Co editor Miss Sanumati Rai
 1955 – 56 Gorkha Weekly : Member of the editorial board
 1957 – Bulletin of the 'All Sikkim Student Association' Darjeeling
 1958 – 'Pole Star', a Tri lingual literary Bulletin of the 'All Sikkim Student Association' Darjeeling
 1956 – Co editor, Sahitya Sanket, Kalimpong (One of his works in his college days)
 1956 – Co editor 'Kanaka'
 1982 – 'Akashdeep' literary magazine of his own publication 'Akashdeep publication'. Chief Editor
 1984 – 86 – 'Bhanu Smarkia' Gangtok, Chief Editor
 1988 – 94 – 'Jan Pukar' {24 issues } News fort nightly. 
 1994 Basundhara Literary magazine from Siliguri : Akashdeep publication.
 2006 onwards – Chief Editor 'Sandhan' A high level literary journal

Given his contributions to the Nepali literature, Mahananda Poudyal himself has been a subject of many dissertation works for scholars of Nepali Literature. Some of them include:
 Mahananda Poudyal ko Jiwani Byaktitwa ra Krititwa ko Adhyan by Narayan Bhattarai, Tribhuwan University, Kathmandu 2007
 Mahananda Poudyal ani unko Jhumra ko Putali, Katha Sanghra ko Kriti Parak ko Adhyan by Narmaya Dangal, Tribuhan University 2008
 Mahananda Poudyal ka Katha Kriti haroo ko Bislesanatkmak Adhyan ra mulyankan by Deepa Sharma, North Bengal University 2009
 A research work done by five eminent writers published by Karuna Devi Smarak Dharmartha Guthi , Gangtok (Mahananda Poudyal : Unka Wiwid Kriti harooma) 2008
 Mahananda Poudyal Abhinandan anka of Pardeshi, A literary magazine, published by Agam Singh Giri Pratisthan Saluwa, West Midnapur, West Bengal.
 'Mahananda Poudyal: Unka Wiwid Kriti Haroo' published by Rachana Publications Gangtok.
 Special Issue of 'Pardeshi' by Agam Singha Giri Sansthan, Saluwa.

Other works
Apart from literary activities, Manahanda Poudyal was also engaged in various political and social activities in Darjeeling and its adjacent regions. He took active participation in the Gorkha identity and upliftment movement and has written several articles on the Akhil Bharatiya Gorkha League. It can be safely assumed that some of his writings have been influenced by the political philosophy of the Gorkhaland movement. These writings drew the attention of the people towards the movement.

He was associated with several social and literary organizations such as Gorkha Dukha Niwarak Sammelan, Akhil Bharatiya Gorkha League, Bhanu Jayanti Samaroah Samiti, Sikkim Sahitya Academy, Kendriya Sikshya Parishad, Rashtriya Pathya Pustak Parishad, Kendriya Sahitya Academy and Purviya Parishad Sanskrit Kendra. See the list below :
 Sahitya Akademi, New Delhi (General Council) 1983 - 1988
 Eastern Zonal Cultural Centre, Kolkatta, (A Zonal unit of the Department of Culture, Government of India) 1993 – 1998
 President, Sikkim Akademi-1999
 Member: Golden Jubilee Celebration of India’s Independence, a state level Committee.
 Member: Textbook and courses of studies, C.B.S.E, New Delhi.
 State President, Vidya Bharati Sansthan, Lucknow on personal capacity.

Awards
For his contributions to the Nepali literature, Mahananda Poudyal has been awarded multiple recognitions. See list below for some of them
 Nepali Sahitya Sammelan award 1998
 Bhanu Puraskar by Nepali Sahitya Parishad, Gangtok 1999
 Shiva Kumar Rai Smriti Puraskar by South Sikkim Sahitya Sammelan, Namchi 2004
 Dr. Parasmani Pradhan Puraskar by Nepali Sahitya Adhyayan Samiti, Kalimpong 2006.
 Basibiyalo Puraskar by Basibiyalo Pariwar, Kalimpong 2009

He has also been felicitated on numerous occasions including:
 Sahitik Patrakar Sanga, Kathmandu 2004
 Mahakavi Deokota Satabdi Samaroha Committee, Kathmandu 2010
 Sikkim Samman Sammilan by Dept. of Culture, Govt. of Sikkim Gangtok 2004
 Nepali Sammelan, New Delhi and Sahitya Akademi, New Delhi (Joint venture) 2009
 Bhasha Diwas Celebration, Nepali Sahitya Parishad, Darjeeling 2009
 Nepali Department of Sikkim University 2013
 Pakyong Palatine College foundation day celebration, Pakyong, East Sikkim 2013

See also
 Nepali literature

References

Nepalese male short story writers
Nepalese short story writers
Living people
People from Kalimpong district
People from Gangtok district
Nepalese male poets
1931 births
Writers from West Bengal
Nepali-language writers from India